Karlton Rolle (born August 14 1990) is a Bahamian sprinter from Nassau, Bahamas who competed in the 100m 200m and 400m. He attended Nassau Christian Academy high school in Nassau, Bahamas, before going on to compete for UCLA.

He won a bronze medal in the 400m open even and the 4x400 relay at the 2005 CARIFTA Games in Tobago. He Also ran the 100m at the 2006 CARIFTA Games where he placed 3rd. He then went on to win the 200m gold at the same games.

Personal bests

References

External links
 World Athletics
 UCLA Bruins

1990 births
Living people
Bahamian male sprinters
Sportspeople from Nassau, Bahamas
People from Nassau, Bahamas
UCLA Bruins men's track and field athletes